Arabsat-6A is a geostationary communications satellite operated by Arabsat. The satellite was built by Lockheed Martin Space Systems on a modernized A2100 bus. The satellite was successfully launched from Kennedy Space Center LC-39A aboard Falcon Heavy on April 11, 2019.

History 
Arabsat-6A and SaudiGeoSat-1/HellasSat-4 are the two satellites of the Arabsat-6G program, ordered by the Arab League to supply the communications needs of member states.

Contracts to build the two satellites were awarded to Lockheed Martin Space Systems in April 2015. Arabsat ultimately awarded the launch contract for Arabsat-6A to SpaceX for a Falcon Heavy flight with no expendable boosters. The Falcon Heavy was chosen over the Falcon 9 due to its far superior thrust; the extra boost would extend the satellite's operational lifespan from 15 years to 18-20 years.

Spacecraft 
Arabsat 6A is based on an updated version of the A2100 bus and is considered among the most advanced communications satellites built. The spacecraft utilizes fixed and steerable Ku-band and Ka-band transponders to provide TV and radio services to the Middle East and North Africa from its station at 30.5°E.

Launch 
Arabsat-6A was launched aboard the first operational Falcon Heavy on 11 April 2019 at 22:35 UTC from Kennedy Space Center LC-39A. Following a successful launch, the twin side boosters separated from the center core and returned to land at Landing Zones 1 and 2, while the center core completed its mission and landed on Of Course I Still Love You. Approximately 34 minutes after launch, the Arabsat-6A was released from the second stage and began a 17-day process to reach its operational orbit.

On June 15th the 4 tonne second stage re-entered the Earth's atmosphere, its orbit having gradually decayed due to atmospheric drag, with an uncontrolled splash down in the Coral Sea east of Australia

References 

Communications satellites in geostationary orbit
Satellites of Saudi Arabia
Spacecraft launched in 2019
2019 in Saudi Arabia
Satellites using the A2100 bus
SpaceX commercial payloads